Association Sportive Olympique de Mahina, is a football club from Mahina, Tahiti. They currently compete in the Tahiti Ligue 2 the second tier of the football system in Tahiti. They play their home games at Stade Municipal de Mahina, which they share with the rival club A.S. Vénus.

Last seasons

References

Football clubs in Tahiti
Football clubs in French Polynesia